The 2013 Atlantic 10 Conference men's soccer season will be the 18th season of men's varsity soccer in the conference. The season will mark the first for the incoming George Mason Patriots. The venue for the 2013 Atlantic 10 Men's Soccer Tournament was Baujan Field at the University of Dayton.

The defending regular season champions are the Charlotte 49ers who left the Atlantic 10 to join Conference USA as part of the 2010–13 NCAA conference realignment. The Saint Louis Billikens are the defending tournament champions.

Changes from 2012 
 Richmond dropped men's soccer after the 2012 season.
 George Mason joined the Atlantic 10 after playing in the Colonial Athletic Association
 Butler, Charlotte, Temple and Xavier all left the conference. Butler and Xavier joined the Big East Conference, Charlotte joined C-USA, and Temple joined the American Athletic Conference.
 Chase Brooks, former head coach of the Niagara Purple Eagles program, was hired by Duquesne.

Season outlook

Teams

Stadia and locations

Personnel

Standings

A10 Tournament 

The format for the 2013 Atlantic 10 Men's Soccer Tournament will be announced in the Fall of 2013.

Results

Statistics

See also 

 Atlantic 10 Conference
 2013 Atlantic 10 Men's Soccer Tournament
 2013 NCAA Division I men's soccer season
 2013 in American soccer

References 

 
2013 NCAA Division I men's soccer season